The 1952 Rhode Island gubernatorial election was held on November 4, 1952. Incumbent Democrat Dennis J. Roberts defeated Republican nominee Raoul Archambault Jr. with 52.62% of the vote.

Primary elections
Primary elections were held on September 24, 1952.

Democratic primary

Candidates
Dennis J. Roberts, incumbent Governor
Arthur E. Marley

Results

General election

Candidates
Dennis J. Roberts, Democratic 
Raoul Archambault Jr., Republican

Results

References

1952
Rhode Island
Gubernatorial